"Begoo be baran", (lit."Tell it to the Rain") is a single by Iranian singer-songwriter Mohsen Namjoo. The poem is by Iranian famous poet Shafiei Kadkani and the whole song is a dialogue with the rain, and its music video is acted by another Iranian musician named Parham Alizadeh. The song is dedicated to Hossein Alizâdeh and Mohammad-Reza Shafiei Kadkani.

It was officially released in March 2019.

References

External links
 in Parham Alizadeh Instagram

Mohsen Namjoo songs
2019 singles
2019 songs